Surguja State, was one of the main princely states of Central India during the period of the British Raj, even though it was not entitled to any gun salute. Formerly it was placed under the Central India Agency, but in 1905 it was transferred to the Eastern States Agency.

The state spread over a vast mountainous area inhabited by many different people groups such as the Gond, Bhumij, Oraon, Panika, Korwa, Bhuiya, Kharwar, Munda, Chero, Rajwar, Nagesia and Santal. Its former territory lies in the present-day state of Chhattisgarh and its capital was the town of Ambikapur, now the capital of Surguja district.

History

According to tradition, the family of the Maharaja is very ancient, and is stated to belong to the Rajputs of the Lunar race Haihaivansh. The present ruling family is said to be descended from a Raksel Raja of Palamau. The state became a British protectorate in 1818 after the Third Anglo-Maratha War. Neighbouring Udaipur State was founded in 1818 as an offshoot of Surguja State. In 1860 The State was conferred to  younger son of Maharaja Amar Singh Deo, to Raja Bahadur Bindeshwari Prasad Singh Deo CSI. The Chief resided at Partabpur, the headquarters of a tract which he held as a maintenance grant in Surguja, and was a ruler of considerable ability and force of character. In 1871 he aided in the suppression of a rebellion in the Keonjhar State, for which he received the thanks of Government, and gifts of an elephant with gold-embroidered trappings and a gold watch and chain. He obtained the title of Raja Bahadur as a personal distinction, and was also made a Companion of the Most Exalted Order of the Star of India. In 1820 hereditary title of Maharaja was conferred on ruling chief of Surguja. Surguja was one of the Chota Nagpur States and its rulers were Rajputs of the Raksel dynasty. They were the de facto overlords of the smaller states of Udaipur, Jashpur, Koriya (Korea) and Changbhakar that were fringing its territory.

Maharaja Indrajit Singh Deo (1827–1879) of Surguja was described as a lunatic by Anglo-Indian writer George Robert Aberigh-Mackay in 1877.

Maharaja Ramanuj Saran Singh Deo, the last ruler of this princely state signed the accession to the Indian Union on 1 January 1948. The Maharaja has the notorious record of having shot and killed a total of 1710 Bengal tigers, the highest known individual score; he doesn't hold the official record of shooting into extinction 3 of the last physically recorded Asiatic cheetahs in India, effectively making the species almost locally extinct in 1947, considering that a female was spotted in what was to be the District of Korea in 1951. The last three Asiatic Cheetas were shot by Maharaja Ramanuj Partap Singh Deo of Korea.

Rulers

The rulers of Surguja State bore the title of 'Maharaja', although a few had the title of 'Maharaja Bahadoor', including the last head of the state.

Rajas
1678 – 1709                Baiha Dadu Singh Deo 
1709 – 1728                Balbhadra Singh I Deo
1728 – 1749                Jaswat Singh Deo 
1749 – 1758                Bahadur Sigh Deo
1760 – 17..                Sheo Singh Deo 
1792 – 1799                Ajit Singh Deo 
1799 – 1800                Balbhadra Singh II Deo (1st time) 
1800 – 1813                Lal Singram Singh Deo
1813 – 1816                Balbhadra Singh II Deo (2nd time) 
1816 – 1820                interregnum 
1820 – 1851                Lal Amar Singh Deo (from 1820 with hereditary style Maharaja) 
1851 – 25 March 1879         Indrajit Singh Deo                 (b. 1827 – d. 1879) 
25 Mar 1879 – 31 December 1917  Raghunath Saran Singh Deo          (b. 1860 – d. 1917) (from 1887 with personal style Maharaja; from 1896 Maharaja Bahadur) 
31 Dec 1917 – 1918         Ramanuj Saran Singh Deo            (b. 1895 – d. 1965) (with hereditary style Maharaja)

Maharaja 
1820 – 1851                Lal Amar Singh Deo (from 1820 with hereditary style Maharaja)

1851 – 25 March 1879 Indrajit Singh Deo (b. 1827 – d. 1879) (Maharaja Bahadur)

25 Mar 1879 – 31 December 1917 Raghunath Saran Singh Deo (b. 1860 – d. 1917) (from 1887 with personal style Maharaja; from 1896 Maharaja Bahadur)

1918 – 15 August 1947         Ramanuj Saran Singh Deo ( Maharaja Bahadur)

2001 - (present day) 
T. S. Singh Deo ( Titular Maharaja )

See also
Balrampur district, Uttar Pradesh
Bhaiyathan
Bilaspur district, Chhattisgarh
Chota Nagpur States
Eastern States Agency
Political integration of India
Rehar River
Surajpur district

References

External links

Surguja district
History of Chhattisgarh
Princely states of India
States and territories disestablished in 1948
Rajputs
1948 disestablishments in India
1603 establishments in India